Rick Dekker (born 15 March 1995) is a Dutch professional footballer who plays as a defensive midfielder for Eerste Divisie club TOP Oss.

Club career
On 30 July 2020, after six years with PEC Zwolle, Dekker joined De Graafschap on a two-year deal with option of a further year.

Dekker joined TOP Oss on 20 June 2022. He made his debut for the club on 5 August, the opening matchday of the 2022–23 Eerste Divisie season, starting in a 3–0 win over Jong Utrecht. On 6 January 2023, he scored his first goal for TOP, slotting home the winner in the 88th minute of a 2–1 home win over Telstar.

International career
In 2013, Dekker made the bench three times for Netherlands U19s during their 2014 UEFA European Under-19 Championship qualifying round campaign.

Honours
PEC Zwolle
 Johan Cruyff Shield: 2014

References

External links
 

1995 births
Living people
Dutch footballers
Association football midfielders
Feyenoord players
PEC Zwolle players
De Graafschap players
TOP Oss players
Eredivisie players
Eerste Divisie players
People from Nederlek
Footballers from South Holland